Freshwater is a 2016 American thriller film written and directed by Brandeis Berry, starring Zoë Bell, Joe Lando, Amy Paffrath, and Alison Haislip. Dread Central likened the film's premise to the 2011 horror film Shark Night.

Plot 
Set in Louisiana, the film centers around a group of young adults that are faced with a scary reality as they realize they are being hunted around their lake house by a giant alligator while a local reptile consultant teams up with the local law enforcement to find out what might be happening.

Cast 
 Zoë Bell as Brenda Gray
 Joe Lando as Sheriff Jones 
 Amy Paffrath as Kim Whitley
 Alison Haislip as Claudia Mosley	
 Tom O'Connell as Agent Sam Colton
 John Bobek as Matt Hanton
 Christopher Biewer as Deputy Clyde
 Derrick Redford as Jason Hightower 
 Donnabella Mortel as Jamie Castell
 Michael St. Michaels as Bob
 Faisal Al-Saja as Travis Beecher
 Marti Hale as Mary
 John V. Ward as John Castleberry
 Kevin Wayne as Trooper Ford
 Brian Waters as Agent Ray

Release
The film was released on DVD in the US on February 14, 2017. It was released in the UK on DVD on June 6, 2016.

Novelization

A novelization of the film was released in July 2021 by novelist Julian Michael Carver. In 2022, the novelization was nominated for the Scribe Award by the International Association of Media Tie-In Writers for "Best Adapted Novel", alongside the novelizations of Alien 3 and Halloween Kills.

References

External links

 Dread Central article

American horror thriller films
Films about crocodilians
Giant monster films
2010s thriller films
2010s English-language films
2010s American films